KNEC is an adult contemporary formatted broadcast radio station licensed to Yuma, Colorado, serving Western Yuma County and Eastern Washington County in Colorado.  KNEC is owned and operated by Media Logic, LLC.

References

External links
Yuma's 100.9 Online

1999 establishments in Colorado
Mainstream adult contemporary radio stations in the United States
Radio stations established in 1999
NEC